Philip John Dykes  (born 2 June 1953) is a Hong Kong barrister and was the Chairman of the Council of the Hong Kong Bar Association from 2018-2021. He had already served in that position from 2005 to 2007. Dykes developed a practice in constitutional and administrative law and has emerged as a voice defending the rule of law in Hong Kong.

In 2020, Dykes entered the race for the Legislative Council's Legal Constituency seat in the first election following the adoption of the national security law.

References

External links 
Bernacchi Chambers Official profile at Bernacchi Chambers

Living people
Barristers of Hong Kong
Hong Kong Senior Counsel
1953 births
Hong Kong Queen's Counsel